In enzymology, a camphor 5-monooxygenase is an enzyme that catalyzes the chemical reaction

(+)-camphor + putidaredoxin + O2  (+)-exo-5-hydroxycamphor + oxidized putidaredoxin + H2O

The 3 substrates of this enzyme are (+)-camphor, putidaredoxin, and O2, whereas its 3 products are (+)-exo-5-hydroxycamphor, oxidized putidaredoxin, and H2O.

This enzyme belongs to the family of oxidoreductases, specifically those acting on paired donors, with O2 as oxidant and incorporation or reduction of oxygen. The oxygen incorporated need not be derived from O2 with reduced iron-sulfur protein as one donor, and incorporation of one atom of oxygen into the other donor. The systematic name of this enzyme class is (+)-camphor,reduced putidaredoxin:oxygen oxidoreductase (5-hydroxylating). Other names in common use include camphor 5-exo-methylene hydroxylase, 2-bornanone 5-exo-hydroxylase, bornanone 5-exo-hydroxylase, camphor 5-exo-hydroxylase, camphor 5-exohydroxylase, camphor hydroxylase, d-camphor monooxygenase, methylene hydroxylase, methylene monooxygenase, D-camphor-exo-hydroxylase, and camphor methylene hydroxylase. It employs one cofactor, heme.

Structural studies

Examples 

Cytochrome P450 camphor 5-monooxygenase is a bacterial enzyme originally from Pseudomonas putida, which catalyzes a critical step in the metabolism of camphor. In 1987, Cytochrome P450cam was the first cytochrome P450 three-dimensional protein structure solved by X-ray crystallography.

It is a heterotrimeric protein derived from the products of three genes: a cytochrome P450 enzyme (encoded by the CamC gene from the CYP family CYP101), a Putidaredoxin (encoded by the CamB gene) complexed with cofactors 2Fe-2S, a NADH-dependent Putidaredoxin reductase (encoded by the CamA gene).

References

Further reading 

 
 

EC 1.14.15
Heme enzymes
Enzymes of known structure